Lauvøya may refer to:

Places
Lauvøya, Flatanger, an island in Flatanger municipality in Trøndelag county, Norway
Lauvøya, Nordland, an island in Dønna municipality in Nordland county, Norway
Lauvøya, Vikna, an island in Vikna municipality in Trøndelag county, Norway
Lauvøya, Åfjord, an island in Åfjord municipality in Trøndelag county, Norway

See also
Løvøya, Telemark